Beautiful Darkness is a young-adult fantasy novel written by Kami Garcia and Margaret Stohl. The second novel in the Caster Chronicles, it was published by Little, Brown on October 12, 2010.  

A sequel, Beautiful Chaos, was released on October 18, 2011. Beautiful Darkness debuted at #3 on the New York Times Bestsellers list for children's books.

Synopsis
The book continues to follow Ethan Wate, a teenage boy living in the small Southern town of Gatlin. He is in love with Lena Duchannes, a girl with the ability to work great magic – something she used to bring Ethan back to life after the events in the preceding book. She's managed to avoid having to make the choice between dark or light, however this doesn't mean that she is free to live her life as she chooses.

Reception
Critical reception for Beautiful Darkness has been positive, with the Manila Bulletin calling it "moody and atmospheric". Booklist praised the book's "gothic atmosphere" and new characters. The School Library Journal blog positively reviewed Beautiful Darkness, with a librarian also giving a positive review for the book's "great storytelling balance". Kirkus Reviews wrote that while the book had a "weaker and more hurried plot" than its predecessor, "readers... will find satisfaction here".

References

External links 

Official Beautiful Creatures website
The Next 'Twilight': The Search Continues At BookExpo America (MTV)

2010 American novels
American young adult novels
Young adult fantasy novels
Young adult romance novels
Paranormal romance novels
Little, Brown and Company books
2010 fantasy novels